Ne Vivam is the debut album by the Dutch doom metal band Officium Triste. It was released in 1997 by Teutonic Existence.

Track listing
  "Frozen Tears"   – 6:07  
  "Lonesome"   – 7:23  
  "A Journey through Lowlands Green"   – 5:13  
  "One with the Sea"   – 9:23  
  "Dreams of Sorrow"   – 5:33  
  "Stardust"   – 5:05  
  "Psyche Nullification"   – 8:04  
  "The Happy Forest"   – 4:32

References 

Officium Triste albums
1997 debut albums